Steigerwaldstadion is a multi-purpose stadium in Erfurt, Germany. The stadium is able to hold 18,611 people and was built in 1931. It is currently used mostly for football matches and is the home stadium of FC Rot-Weiß Erfurt.

From 1948 to 1991 (the time of the German Democratic Republic), Steigerwaldstadion was known as the Georgij-Dimitroff-Stadion, after Bulgarian communist leader Georgi Dimitrov (1882–1949).

Bon Jovi performed at the stadium during their These Days Tour on June 13, 1996 & during their Bounce Tour on May 25, 2003.

References

External links
 Steigerwaldstadion at rot-weiss-erfurt.de 

Football venues in East Germany
Football venues in Germany
FC Rot-Weiß Erfurt
Athletics (track and field) venues in Germany
Sports venues in Thuringia
Buildings and structures in Erfurt
Sports venues completed in 1931